Scott Krinsky (born November 24, 1968) is an American actor and comic best known for his role as Jeffrey "Jeff" Barnes on the hit TV series Chuck and his role as Darryl on The O.C.

He was born in Washington, D.C., in 1968 and attended Sherwood High School (Sandy Springs, Maryland), Class of 1986. Then attended Salisbury University, where he majored in communication and broadcast journalism. He has also attended The Epicurean School of Culinary Arts in Los Angeles.  In addition to being an actor, he is a writer and a stand-up comedian who performs at The Comedy Store and Improv in Los Angeles.

Filmography

Films

Television

References

External links

 

1968 births
American male television actors
Living people
Male actors from Los Angeles
Male actors from Washington, D.C.
Salisbury University alumni